In a Restless House is the debut album of the alternative rock band, City Calm Down. It was released on 6 November 2015, through I Oh You. Two singles were released "Rabbit Run" and "Son". The album was released on CD and 12" Vinyl. The band promoted the album on two Australian tours in October 2015 and April 2016. They also promoted the album with a short six-date tour in England, including a performance at the Brighton Festival.

Critical reception
The album debuted at 25 on the ARIA Charts. The album was praised with much positive feedback. It became Triple J's featured album of the week, also having several songs from the album having some airplay. It was praised by Rolling Stone – "Introspection and elation still tussle, but self-assuredness is what marks this impressive rebirth". Their single "Rabbit Run" was also voted in the Triple J Hottest 100 and came 137th place. Their song "Your Fix" features in the 2017 video game, AFL Evolution.

Track listing

Personnel
Adapted from Discogs.

Musicians
 Jack Bourke – vocals
 Samuel Mullaly – synth
 Jeremy Sonnenberg – bass
 Lee Armstrong – drums
 Patrick Santamaria – additional guitar (tracks 3, 4, 6, 8, 9)
 Alex Howroyd – horns (tracks 3, 6, 7, 10)
 Andrew Werner – horns (tracks 3, 6, 7, 10)
 Greg Spence – horns (tracks 3, 6, 7, 10)
 Kerri Harvey – backing vocals (tracks 3, 7)
 Zachary Hamilton-Reeves – backing vocals (track 3)

Production
 Malcolm Besley – production, mixing, recording
 Steve Smart – mastering

Artwork
 Gordon Sonnenberg – cover illustration
 Samuel Mullaly – artwork design and layout

Charts

References

2015 albums